Mundine may refer to any of the following people
Beau Mundine (born 1980), Australian minor-league rugby league footballer
Lynette Riley-Mundine (born 1956), Australian academic and artist, wife of Warren
Tony Mundine (disambiguation)
Warren Mundine (born 1956), Australian Aboriginal leader
a mundine A short period of time